Tan Aik Mong (6 April 1950 – 31 May 2020) was a Malaysian Chinese badminton player. He was the younger brother of Tan Aik Huang.

Achievements

Asian Championships 
Men's singles

Southeast Asian Peninsular Games 
Men's singles

International tournaments 
Men's singles

Men's doubles

References

1950 births
2020 deaths
People from Penang
Malaysian sportspeople of Chinese descent
Malaysian people of Teochew descent
Sportspeople from Penang
Malaysian male badminton players
Southeast Asian Games medalists in badminton
Southeast Asian Games silver medalists for Malaysia
Competitors at the 1973 Southeast Asian Peninsular Games
Badminton players at the 1974 Asian Games
Asian Games competitors for Malaysia
Badminton players at the 1972 Summer Olympics
University of Malaya alumni